Rick and Morty – Head-Space (alternatively stylised as Headspace, without the hyphen) is a graphic novel, written by Tom Fowler (in his writing debut) and illustrated by CJ Cannon, which was released in three parts throughout 2016 by Oni Press, as the third volume of the comic series based on the television series of the same name by Justin Roiland and Dan Harmon. The only multi-part story arc of the series written by Fowler, following the departure of Zac Gorman, and before the introduction of Kyle Starks, Part One was released on March 30, 2016, Part Two was released on April 27, 2016, and Part Three was released on May 25, 2016, with the collected volume including the one-shots Ready Player Morty and Big Game (The Noble Pursuit of Fair Play), respectively written by Pamela Ribon, illustrated by Marc Ellerby, and released on February 24, 2016; and written and illustrated by Fowler, and released on June 29, 2016.

The series is notable as the last Rick and Morty comic series arc to follow the Rick Sanchez and Morty Smith of Dimension C-132 (who are killed at the conclusion of the storyline), with all subsequent arcs of the main series (with the exception of The Rickoning) switching focus to follow Rick C-137 and Morty Prime, the same versions of the characters from the television series (via the plot element of interdimenstional travel). The third chapter of the storyline loosely adapts Dune by Frank Herbert, a concept later revisited in the 2022 spin-off series Rick and Morty Presents: HeRicktics of Rick, with Mortys inspired by both interpretations of Dune later being made available as playable characters in the video game Pocket Mortys.

In September 2021, Christopher Lloyd and Jaeden Martell respectively portrayed the Rick and Morty of Dimension C-132 in one of a series of promotional interstitials, directed by Paul B. Cummings.

Premise

Part One
In a very special issue of Rick and Morty, the family finds RICK'S SEVERED HEAD! Unable to find Morty, they assume both are dead and begin the somber steps of funeral arrangement. Meanwhile, Rick and Morty… have bigger problems.

Part Two
Rick and Morty are stuck inside the severed head of another dimension's Morty, and things are getting... weird. They still have a narrow chance of saving their own dimension from alien invasion… but only if Morty can get the science right!

Part Three
Having survived their adventures fending off alien invasions in "head-space," Rick and Morty finally return home just in time for the beginning of the same freakin' alien invasion. Can Rick and Morty stave off this newest, samest invasion? What awful decisions will they be forced to make? How long will this new galactic empire last? (Maybe 80 years? More? Probably somewhere in there).

One-shots

Ready Player Morty
In this special one-shot, the Rick and Morty of Dimension C-132 go to a Roy-type high school simulation planet that allows the player to accelerate their experiences straight to a diploma in just one day. Rick repeatedly kills Morty's character, forcing him to restart in more and more vicious (and sometimes illegal) high school experiences-until Morty does things the way Rick wants and finds himself on the brink of an intergalactic war. But ultimately Morty will be Morty, no matter what universe or scenario. Meanwhile, in a tribute to Freaky Friday, Jerry and Summer stumble upon one of Rick's unattended experiments and end up body-switching! Summer must find a way to get back into her body before her dad ruins her reputation or her mom rounds second base.

The title and plot is a reference to the 2011 science fiction novel Ready Player One.

Big Game (The Noble Pursuit of Fair Play)
In this special one-shot, after being goaded into an argument with Season Two Jerry about the 'noble nature' of hunting, Rick C-137 takes Jerry and Morty Prime to the biggest Game in the Galaxy, where parents bet on their children as they fight to the death in a giant murdertorium! And Morty gets a front row seat (albeit as a contestant)! Will Rick save Morty in time to prevent him competing? Will Jerry manage to elude the space mob? Will Morty find love in the bowels of the arena before it's too late? Probably not.

Development
Speaking on his "writing stint" on Rick and Morty ahead of its March release in January 2016, in a non-spoiler interview with Paste Magazine, Tom Fowler revealed the arc would be inspired by the first season of Rick and Morty (having then not seen the second season), in particular "Rick Potion #9", and that as the veteran illustrator's writing debut, he would be "carte blanche to do anything, as long as you can come up with some kind of [a] scientific explanation that’s both coherently and comedically relevant" with one issue of Zac Gorman's run additionally providing inspiration for the three-issue arc:

In one issue of Zac [Gorman]’s that I read all the way through, they're in this alien death maze, and there's only enough charge in the portal gun to get one of them out. Rick gives Morty some kind of excuse and shoves him through. Then there’s this beat where Rick is alone at the end of this maze. It's a silent panel, and you just see how sad and like, existentially alone Rick is. That hit me in the gut, and I said, “Okay, that’s what I'm going for. That's the thing I want to keep. Everything else can be drawn from whatever situations I or my 8-year-old can come up with.”

In other media
In September 2021, Christopher Lloyd and Jaeden Martell respectively portrayed the Rick Sanchez and Morty Smith of Dimension C-132 in one of a series of three promotional interstitials, directed by Paul B. Cummings. Several Mortys inspired by Dune-based third chapter of Head-Space (and HeRicktics of Rick) were later made available as playable characters in updates to the free-to-play role-playing video game Pocket Mortys.

Reception

Collected editions 

Bob Franco of Comics Verse complimented the "fun adventure with plenty of laughs and imaginative situations" of Ready Player Morty, with Emily Gaudette of Inverse describing Big Game as a "non-enthused novelization of the show", and David Brooke of AIPT Comics complimenting Fowler as "manag[ing] to capture the [concept of] rage and fear so damn well there's no question [what] is a comedically traumatic moment" in depicting the inner rage of Morty Smith.

References

2016 graphic novels
Head-Space
Oni Press titles
Books based on Dune (franchise)